The 2008 Nebraska Republican presidential primary took place on May 13, 2008. John McCain won the primary, although he had secured his party's nomination weeks before the election through his performance in earlier primary contests.

Nebraska's primary was non-binding and only indicated Republican voters' preference for President.  Nebraska Republicans' State Convention ultimately chose the delegates to the 2008 Republican National Convention, who formally nominated the Republican candidate for the Presidency.  The State Convention took place on July 12.  Delegates to the state convention were elected at county conventions held between the first and tenth of June.  Predictably, nearly all of the delegates chosen by the state convention were McCain supporters, although "at least one" delegate was a supporter of Ron Paul.

Results

See also
 2008 Nebraska Democratic presidential caucuses
 2008 Republican Party presidential primaries

References

Nebraska
2008 Nebraska elections
Nebraska Republican primaries